Better Half, Better Halves, and derivatives thereof may refer to:

Television
 The Better Half (TV series), a 2017 Philippine drama television series
 Better Halves (TV series), a TVB costume television series

Episodes
 "Better Half", a season-one episode of the American action crime drama television series Sons of Anarchy
 "Better Half", a season-eight episode of the American medical drama television series House
 "The Better Half", a season-six episode of the American period drama television series Mad Men
 "Better Halves", a season-one episode of the American superhero drama television series Heroes
 "Better Halves", a season-five episode of the American espionage television series Burn Notice

Other uses
 The Better Half, an American comic strip created by Bob Barnes
 The Better Half (play), a one-act play by Noël Coward first performed in 1922
 Better Half VW, an American aircraft engine
 Better Halves (film), a 1916 American film featuring Oliver Hardy
 My Better Half, a collaborative studio album by Tex Perkins and Tim Rogers
 "You're My Better Half", a song co-written and recorded by Australian country music artist Keith Urban

See also
 The Other Half (disambiguation)